Sentinel may refer to:

Places

Mountains
 Mount Sentinel, a mountain next to the University of Montana in Missoula, Montana
 Sentinel Buttress, a volcanic crag on James Ross Island, Antarctica
 Sentinel Dome, a naturally occurring granite dome in Yosemite National Park, California
 Sentinel Mountain (Montana), in Glacier National Park
 Sentinel Peak (Alberta)
 Sentinel Peak (Antarctica)
 Sentinel Peak (Arizona), a peak in the Tucson Mountains
 Sentinel Peak (British Columbia)
 Sentinel Range, a mountain range in Antarctica
 The Sentinel, Hout Bay
 The Sentinel (Zion), a sandstone summit in Zion National Park, Utah

Elsewhere

 Sentinel, Arizona
 Sentinel, California
 Sentinel, Missouri
 Sentinel, Oklahoma
 Sentinel Island (disambiguation)

Arts, entertainment, and media

Artworks
 Sentinel (sculpture), a 2000 sculpture by Tim Tolkien
 Sentinels (Hudson), a 2005 public artwork by American artist Jon Barlow Hudson

Comics
 Sentinel (comic book), a comic book series

Characters
 Sentinel (Beast Wars), a computer in the TV show Beast Wars
 Sentinel (comics), one of a group of mutant-hunting robots in the Marvel Universe
 Sentinel, a paradigm role in Final Fantasy XIII
 Sentinel, a character class in the Mass Effect universe
 Alan Scott, the original Green Lantern, who used the alias "Sentinel" at one point
 Sentinels, a faction in Call of Duty: Advanced Warfare
 Sentinels, one of the two teams in Defense of the Ancients
 Sentinels, a group of super soldiers infected with a variant of the Chimera virus in Resistance 2
 Sentinels, a law enforcement-themed clan in Urban Rivals
 The Sentinel, a boss character in Borderlands: The Pre-Sequel
 The Sentinel, the fictitious military academy attended by Frank Underwood, in the Netflix Originals TV series House of Cards

Films
 The Sentinel (1977 film), a film based on the Jeffrey Konvitz novel
 The Sentinel (1992 film) (La Sentinelle in French), a film by the French director Arnaud Desplechin
 The Sentinel (2006 film), a thriller directed by Clark Johnson starring Michael Douglas

Gaming
 Sentinel (iOS game), a 2010 iOS sci-fi tower defense game
 Sentinel, a 1984 computer game created by Bryan Brandenburg
 Sentinel (1990 video game), a game for the Atari 2600 and 7800 developed by Imagineering
 Sentinel: Descendants in Time, a 2004 computer game published by Detalion
 The Sentinel (module), an adventure module for Dungeons & Dragons
 The Sentinel (video game), a 1986 game created by Geoff Crammond
 Sentinel, a sniper rifle in battle royale game Apex Legends
 Sentinels (esports), an American esports company

Literature
 Gundam Sentinel, a 1987 serial "photo-novel"
 Sentinels novels, a series of novels by Van Allen Plexico
 The Sentinel (anthology), a collection of short stories by Arthur C. Clarke
 The Sentinel (Konvitz novel), a 1974 novel by Jeffrey Konvitz
 "The Sentinel" (short story), a 1951 short story by Arthur C. Clarke
 The Sentinel (Child novel), a 2020 novel by Lee and Andrew Child
 The Sentinels (Carter novel), a 1980 young adult novel by Peter Carter

Music

Groups and labels
 Sentinel (band), an American indie dream rock duo
 Sentinel Sound, a reggae and dancehall sound system from Stuttgart, Germany

Albums
 Sentinel (album), a 1979 album by Nigel Mazlyn Jones
 "Sentinel" (instrumental), by Mike Oldfield
 The Sentinel (album), an album by Pallas

Songs
 "Sentinel", a song by Celldweller on the album Soundtrack for the Voices in My Head Vol. 2
 "Sentinel", a song by Alice Cooper on his album Dragontown
 "Sentinel", a song by At The Throne of Judgment on their album The Arcanum Order
 "Sentinel", a song by Hilltop Hoods on their album The Calling
 "The Sentinel", a song by Judas Priest on their album Defenders of the Faith
 "Sentinel", a song by VNV Nation on their album Of Faith, Power and Glory

Periodicals
 Sentinel (newspaper), a list of newspapers called Sentinel
 Christian Science Sentinel (originally The Christian Science Weekly), an American magazine
 CTC Sentinel
 The Sentinel (Guwahati), published in Gauhati, Assam, India
 The Sentinel (KSU), published by Kennesaw State University
 The Sentinel, published by journalism students at Heritage High School
 The Sentinel, published by Melbourne High School

Television
 "The Sentinel" (Stargate SG-1), a TV episode
 The Sentinel (TV series), a Canadian television series that ran from 1996 to 1999
 "The Sentinel" (American Horror Story), an episode of the eleventh season of American Horror Story

Brands and enterprises
 Sentinel (publisher), a book publisher
 Sentinel (revolver), a brand of gun made by High Standard Manufacturing Company
 Sentinel, a brand name for the drug cenegermin
 Sentinel Offender Services, a for-profit probation company
 Sentinel Sound, a reggae and dancehall sound system from Stuttgart, Germany
 SentinelOne, a cybersecurity company based in Mountain View, California

Buildings
 Sentinel Building (disambiguation), multiple buildings with this name
 Sentinel Secondary School, a school in West Vancouver, British Columbia
 The Sentinels, two residential block towers in Birmingham, UK

Computing
 Sentinel (FBI), an FBI software project replacing the failed Virtual Case File
 Sentinel node, an object to represent the end of a data structure
 Sentinel value, a flag value used to terminate a loop, a variable length list, or other analogous purpose

Military
 AN/GSQ-272 Sentinel, a United States Air Force weapons system
 LGM-35 Sentinel, an American intercontinental missile under development
 MPQ-64 Sentinel, a radar used by the United States military
 Raytheon Sentinel, an aircraft used by the Royal Air Force
 RQ-170 Sentinel, USAF stealth drone officially acknowledged in early December 2009
 Sentinel tank, an Australian-built World War II Cruiser Tank
 Sentinel-class cutter, a Fast Response Cutter with the United States Coast Guard
 Sentinels, some members of the 3rd U.S. Infantry Regiment
 Stinson L-5 Sentinel, a World War II era American liaison aircraft

Science and technology
 Sentinel (satellite), GMES Sentinel satellites, series of ESA funded Earth Observation satellites
 Sentinel (space telescope), a proposed (but cancelled) asteroid-hunting infrared telescope by the B612 Foundation
 Animal sentinels, animals which give early indications to environmental hazards
 Sentinel lymph node, the first lymph node affected by a metastasising cancer
 The Sentinel series, a series of US radioisotope thermoelectric generators

Transportation

Locomotives and lorries
 Sentinel Waggon Works, a British engineering firm that produced lorries and locomotives:
 LMS Sentinels 7160-3
 LMS Sentinel 7164, a small shunting locomotive
 LMS Sentinel 7192, a geared steam locomotive
 S&DJR Sentinels, two small steam locomotives for shunting

Vessels
 Sentinel (steamboat), a small wooden steamboat associated with the Puget Sound Mosquito Fleet

Others
 Sentinel (horse)
 A Newspaper on Saint Helena

See also
Sentinel Project (disambiguation)
 Centinela (disambiguation)
 La Sentinelle (disambiguation)
 North Sentinel Island, Bay of Bengal
 Sentinelese, an ethnic group on North Sentinel Island
 Sentry (disambiguation)
 South Sentinel Island, Bay of Bengal